This list is of the Cultural Properties of Japan designated in the category of  for the Prefecture of Wakayama.

National Cultural Properties
As of 1 February 2015, three Important Cultural Properties have been designated, being of national significance.

Prefectural Cultural Properties
As of 1 February 2014, three properties have been designated at a prefectural level.

See also
 Cultural Properties of Japan
 List of National Treasures of Japan (historical materials)
 List of Historic Sites of Japan (Wakayama)

References

External links
  Cultural Properties in Wakayama Prefecture

Cultural Properties,historical materials
Historical materials,Wakayama